Sukhoy Nos (literally 'Dry Cape'; there is another Sukhoy Nos on Vaygach island south of Novaya Zemlya) is a cape on Severny Island, the northern island of the archipelago Novaya Zemlya, projecting westward into the Barents Sea. The site lies near the southwestern corner of the island,  from Mityushikha Bay, north of Matochkin Strait, which separates Severny from Yuzhny Island, the southern island of the archipelago. 

The cape is composed of black and reddish shale. Underwater sandbars are located off its northern shore. In the 19th century, numerous birds nested on the steep cliffs, particularly loons.

History
Sukhoy Nos was a site of nuclear testing for the former USSR, being the third and the northernmost detonating site of three on the Novaya Zemlya archipelago (designated "Zone C"). It was used between 1958 and 1961 and in October 1961 was the site of the record-breaking 50-megaton hydrogen bomb, known as Tsar Bomba.

References

Novaya Zemlya
Russian nuclear test sites
Nuclear test sites
Nuclear weapons program of the Soviet Union
Sukhoy Nos